Playa Herradura (Herradura Beach) is a coastal town in the Central Pacific Region of Costa Rica. The name Herradura (horseshoe) refers to the horseshoe shape of the bay. The town has developed into an important tourist destination in Costa Rica. The Marina is home to the largest fleet of Sports fishing boats in the country.

Located right next door to Jacó Beach and one hour from Costa Rica's primary International airport in San José, the Juan Santamaría International Airport (SJO). Playa Herradura and the Jacó Beach region, has become the most popular tourist destination in all of Costa Rica. Vacation rental condos, homes and a great variety of tours and excursions contribute to this region's vast popularity with foreigners and locals.

Populated places in Puntarenas Province